Aulia Hidayat (born 2 May 1999) is an Indonesian professional footballer who plays as a midfielder for Liga 2 club Semen Padang.

Club career

Borneo
In 2018, Aulia signed a year contract with Indonesian Liga 1 club Borneo. He made his professional debut on 7 July 2018 in a match against Perseru Serui at the Segiri Stadium, Samarinda.

Badak Lampung
In 2019, Aulia Hidayat signed a contract with Indonesian Liga 1 club Badak Lampung. He made his debut on 18 May 2019 in a match against TIRA-Persikabo. On 5 November 2019, Hidayat scored his first goal for Badak Lampung against Borneo at the Segiri Stadium, Samarinda.

Semen Padang
He was signed for Semen Padang to play in Liga 2 in the 2020 season. This season was suspended on 27 March 2020 due to the COVID-19 pandemic. The season was abandoned and was declared void on 20 January 2021.

International career
On 6 June 2017, Aulia made his debut against Scotland U20 in the 2017 Toulon Tournament in France. And Aulia is one of the players that strengthen Indonesia U19 in 2018 AFC U-19 Championship.

Career statistics

Club

References

External links 
 Aulia Hidayat at Soccerway
 Aulia Hidayat at Liga Indonesia

1999 births
Living people
Badak Lampung F.C. players
Liga 1 (Indonesia) players
Indonesian footballers
Association football midfielders
Borneo F.C. players
Sportspeople from Aceh